Tashkent Institute of Finance, also known as Tashkent Financial Institute is one of the leading universities in Uzbekistan. It is located in the center of Tashkent.

Tashkent Institute of Finance offers:
 Pre-university programs including finance and tax lyceums, bank college,
 Bachelor's degree with majors including Finance, Banking, and Valuation
 Master's degree
 PhD programs

The programs are provided in Uzbek, Russian and English. An "E-university" system is established. Moreover, the institute provides students with sports and social activities.

History 
The institute was founded in 1931, as the Central Asian Financial-Economical Institution. Later it was renamed as Tashkent Financial-Economical Institution. In 1962 its name was changed to Tashkent State Economical University.

After Uzbekistan gained independence, the university became the Tashkent Financial Institute within the Tashkent State Economical University on May 13, 1991.

Thereafter the Institute taught more than 13,500 professionals.

Strategies for development 
The institute's plans include:
 Pay attention to gifted and eager students and supply everything necessary for them to succeed
 Develop the qualifications and knowledge of professors and teachers
 Improve the textbooks and develop new materials
 Reinforce the relations with the universities from developed countries. Make the university equal to the international universities
 Attract international investors to develop the university
 Work with the National Academy of Uzbekistan, with Uzbeki central and commercial banks, the Ministry of Finance and other companies to better integrate theoretical and practical knowledge

Faculties 
Currently seven working faculties operate at the Tashkent Institute of Finance:

 Financial management faculty
 Accounts and audit faculty
 Credit-economy faculty
 Finance-economy faculty
 Insurance faculty
 Budget accounts and state funds faculty
 Magistracy branch

The faculties include 26 departments.

More than 350 professors and teachers work there. The university assists teachers to enhance their practical knowledge by giving qualification training.

Financial management  
The Financial Management faculty opened in 2004 under the name of "Management". In 2011 the faculty took its current name. From 2003 to 2010, F. Karimov was the leader of the faculty. From 2010 to 2012 F. Babashev controlled the faculty. From 2012 O. Astanakulov became the dean.

The faculty consists of four departments:
 Management and marketing
 Financial management
 Professional education
 Uzbek and Russian languages

Location: Uzbekistan, Tashkent, Kichikhalqa road – 7 house

Accounts and audit  
The Accounts and audit faculty was established in 1946 under the Leningrad Institute. In the first year 54 students graduated. The first major was Statistics, starting in 1948. Later majors include Accounts in State bank (1955), Accounts in agriculture (1952) and Accounts and economical changes in transport corporations (1964). From 1980, Controlling became a major. After Independence the faculty obtained its current name. Graduates are work in corporations and state companies. In 1990 Republican Accountants and Auditors Union was established. As of 2017 the dean was Karimova Komila Doniyorovna.

Location: A.Temur street 60A

Credit-economy   
This faculty opened in 1946 under the name of "Credit economy" and "Finance-economy". After Independence the Credit-economy faculty opened on June 1, 1991. As of 2017 the dean was N. Oblomurodov. The three departments are:
 Bank work
 Accounts and audit in banks
 Information and communication technologies

Facilities 
 Conference hall (215 each) – 2 halls
 Study rooms (1000 total) – 33 rooms
 Computer classes (210 total) – 2 classes
 Language rooms – 3 rooms

Location: 10000, A. Temur street 60A

Finance-economics  
This is the institute's biggest faculty. It opened in 1946. Its current name came following Independence. It includes four departments. As of 2017 the dean was R. D. Rustamovich.

The faculty partners with international universities. Professors and teachers regularly attend training abroad, in universities such as Texas A&M, Ritsumeikan, Asian Pacific Ocean University, University of Stirling, Moscow Finance Academy, Moscow State University, St. Petersburg Economic and Finance, University of Mannheim, University of Passau, Hamburg University of Information Technologiy, Universiti Teknologi MARA, and Indian Financial University.

Location: A. Temur 60A

Insurance  
The Insurance faculty opened in 2005 under the name of Tax and insurance work. In 2011 it obtained its current name. This faculty co-operates with international universities. Its three departments are:
 Tax
 Insurance 
 Philosophy and theory of building a democratic nation

As of 2017 the dean was R. U. Ablakulovich.

Location: Kichikxalqa road 7 house

Budget accounts and state funds  
The Budget accounts and state funds faculty opened in 2004 as the Universal economy. On 29 January 2010 the faculty obtained its current name. As of 2017 the dean K. J. Imomboevich. The five departments in this faculty are:
 Pensions
 Investments
 Budgets
 Business
 Physical education and sport

Location: A.Temur street 60A

Magistracy branch 
The Magistracy branch was established to provide prospective students with the chance to undertake postgraduate programs. The branch consists of two courses, and in 2012 it enrolled 866 students (508 from course one, 358 from course 2). As of 2016 the dean was A. U. Davlatovich. The 14 departments are: 
 Finance
 Theory of economy
 Bank work
 Accounts and audit in banks
 Accounting
 Audit
 Financial analysis
 Statistics
 Financial management
 Budget counting
 Exchequer work
 Financial market and money
 Investments
 Insurance

Location: Tashkent

Dormitories 
The institute offers three dormitories. Dorm rooms house 2-3 students. Each stage has restrooms, kitchens and study halls. It hosts the sport hall with modern equipment. Each dormitory offers 11 newspapers and magazines.

Dormitory 1 
Dormitory 1 is on A. Xidoyatov street. This dormitory consists of four stories and houses 235 students.  As of 2017 the director was Sh. Qodirova.

Dormitory 2 
Dormitory 2 is on Chimboy street. This dormitory has four stages with 175 places. As of 2017 its director was Q. Bekimbetov.

Dormitory 3 
Dormitory is on Osiyo street 1-house. It has nine levels housing 193 students. As off 2017 its director was N. Axunjanova.

Recognition 
Tashkent Financial Institute was ranked with the 9th position as the best masters ranking in economics (2013-2014).

References 

 Web-page containing the information about the university
 Web-page with the information about Institute

See also 

TEAM University Tashkent
Turin Polytechnic University in Tashkent
Inha University in Tashkent
Tashkent State Technical University
Tashkent Institute of Irrigation and Melioration
Tashkent Automobile and Road Construction Institute
Management Development Institute of Singapore in Tashkent
Tashkent State University of Economics
Tashkent State Agrarian University
Tashkent State University of Law
Tashkent University of Information Technologies
University of World Economy and Diplomacy
Westminster International University in Tashkent

Education in Tashkent
Universities in Uzbekistan